Hinduism in Armenia remains a minor feature in Armenian religious life, generally represented through The International Society for Krishna Consciousness and a minority of Indian students, with backgrounds in Hinduism.

History
There was a colony of Indians on the upper Euphrates in Armenia as early as second century BC and temples were raised in honour of Sri Krishna, a representation of the Supreme Personality of Godhead in Gaudiya Vaishnavism.

According to Zenob Glak, one of the first disciples of Gregory the Illuminator, the patron saint of Armenia, at least 7 Hindu cities were established in Armenia sometime around 349 B.C. The institution of Nakharar was founded by Hindu Kings from even earlier. Zenob wrote that the colony was established by two Indian princes from Ujjain who had taken refuge in Armenia. They worshipped Ganesha and their descendants multiplied and ruled over a large part of Armenia. Under the rulers, the Hindu cities flourished until the dawn of Christianity in Armenia in 301 A.D.

The ruins of the Saint Karapet Monastery, now in Turkey,  stands at the site of the Hindu temples.

Religious organisations
The International Society for Krishna Consciousness (ISKCON) and Transcendental Meditation organisations are both active in Armenia. In 1990 ISKCON was, for the first time, officially registered as a religion in Armenia. There are now about 250 ISKCON members resident in Armenia and ISKCON maintains congregations in the towns of Gyumri, Vanadzor, Yeghegnadzor, Kapan and Ashtarak.

See also

 Central Asians in Ancient Indian literature
 Hinduism by country
 Zoroastrianism in Armenia
 Religion in Armenia

References

External links
  (hinduonnet.com)
 Persecution of Hare Krishna Members in Armenia (iskcon.com)
 "Hindoos in Armenia" by Dr. Mesrob Jacob Seth
 Indian Students in Armenia (armeniandiaspora.com)
 "When KGB closed in on Lord Krishna" (telegraphindia.com)

Armenia
Religion in Armenia
Human migration
Armenia
Foreign relations of ancient India